Erpeli is a rural locality (a selo) and the administrative centre of Erpelinsky Selsoviet, Buynaksky District, Republic of Dagestan, Russia. The population was 3,412 as of 2010. There are 33 streets.

Geography 
Erpeli is located 14 km west of Buynaksk (the district's administrative centre) by road, on the Shuraozen River. Verkhny Karanay and Nizhneye Ishkarty are the nearest rural localities.

References 

Rural localities in Buynaksky District